On 1 August 1948, Air France Flight 072 went missing over the Atlantic Ocean, presumably killing all 52 people on board. The accident led to the withdrawal of the Latécoère 631 from service by Air France. It was the deadliest aircraft accident in the Atlantic Ocean at the time and also the deadliest suffered by that type of aircraft.

Aircraft
The accident aircraft was Latécoère 631 F-BDRC, Lionel de Marnier, msn 06. with a first flight on 9 November 1947.

Accident
The aircraft departed from Fort de France, Martinique at 14:50 GMT on 31 July, and was due to arrive at Port-Etienne, French West Africa at 01:00 GMT on 1 August. It was carrying a crew of twelve and 40 passengers. It was reported that a mayday had been received by an American radio station in the Azores just after midnight on 1 August. Two Air France aircraft, a French Air Force aircraft and a French Navy ship were sent to search for the aircraft. The United States Coast Guard sent  to assist in the search. The Portuguese authorities allowed aircraft searching for the missing Latécoère 631 to use the Ilha do Sal Airport, which was not then open to traffic. Two Portuguese Air Force Boeing B-17 Flying Fortresses also joined the search. The United States Air Force sent a Flying Fortress and seven Boeing B-29 Superfortresses to join the search.

On 3 August, the French weather ship Leverrier reported receiving a distress message from the aircraft. A second message was received early the next morning. The American Flying Fortress also reported receiving a "faint and garbled" distress message that day. An aircraft later reported seeing wreckage  from the position the seats were found. Some of the wreckage showed evidence of fire. The search for survivors was called off on 9 August. Following the accident, which was the worst crash in the Atlantic Ocean at the time and also the worst ever suffered by the Latécoère 631, the type was withdrawn from service by Air France.

References

Aviation accidents and incidents in 1948
Aviation accidents and incidents in the Atlantic Ocean
072
Airliner accidents and incidents with an unknown cause
Missing aircraft
August 1948 events